Music Through Heartsongs: Songs Based on the Poems of Mattie J.T. Stepanek (sometimes abbreviated to Music Through Heartsongs) is the third studio album by the American country music singer Billy Gilman, released on April 15, 2003, on Epic Records Nashville. It is his final album for that label. The songs on this album are based on poems written by the child poet Mattie Stepanek, who died of muscular dystrophy one year after the album's release.

Track listing

Personnel
 Angela Bacari – background vocals
 Bekka Bramlett – background vocals
 Joe Chemay – bass guitar
 Mickey Jack Cones – electric guitar, background vocals
 Eric Darken – percussion
 Billy Gilman – lead vocals, string arrangements
 Tommy Harden – drums
 John Jorgenson – electric guitar
 Troy Lancaster – electric guitar
 Sam Levine – alto flute, recorder
 Alé Lorenzo – ukulele
 Jerry McPherson – electric guitar
 David Malloy – background vocals
 Liana Manis – background vocals
 Wendy Moten – background vocals
 Jimmy Nichols – keyboards, piano, string arrangements, background vocals
 Britt Savage – background vocals
 Michael Spriggs – acoustic guitar

Chart performance

References

2003 albums
Epic Records albums
Billy Gilman albums
Music based on poems